The IMOCA 60 Class yacht PRB 2, FRA 85 was designed by Finot-Conq and launched in the May 2000 after being built CDK Technologies based in Lorient, France.

Racing results

Timeline

2000-2005 PRB 2
This boat replaced the first PRB and was launched in 1996.

In 2005 the boat was replaced by PRB 3

2005-2010 Roxy (2)
The boat is purchased to replace ROXY (1).

2010 Fruit POL 8384

References 

Individual sailing vessels
2000s sailing yachts
Sailing yachts designed by Finot-Conq
Vendée Globe boats
IMOCA 60